Vítor Luiz Faverani Tatsch (born May 5, 1988) is a Brazilian professional basketball player who plays for Flamengo of the Novo Basquete Brasil (NBB). He has also represented Brazil in international competition and holds a Spanish passport.

Professional career

Spain
Faverani arrived in Spain at age 14 and started playing for Unicaja's junior ranks. In 2005, he joined Clínicas Rincón Axarquía of the LEB Oro, the junior team of Unicaja. In 2006, he joined the Unicaja senior team where he made his Liga ACB debut during the 2006–07 season. He also spent time with CAI Zaragoza in 2006–07, playing 24 games in the LEB Oro. For the 2007–08 season, he was loaned to Gipuzkoa BC. In 2008–09, he played seven EuroLeague games for Málaga while also spending time with Clínicas Rincón Axarquía.

After going undrafted in the 2009 NBA draft, Faverani parted ways with Málaga on August 26, 2009. The next day, he signed with CB Murcia.

After two seasons with Murcia, Faverani signed a two-year deal (with the option of a third) with Valencia Basket on July 19, 2011. On September 1, 2012, he extended his contract with the club through the 2014–15 season. However, following the 2012–13 season, he parted ways with Valencia in the hopes of signing in the NBA.

Boston Celtics
On July 22, 2013, Faverani signed a three-year deal with the Boston Celtics. During his rookie season, he had multiple assignments with the Maine Red Claws of the NBA Development League. On March 7, 2014, he underwent successful left knee arthroscopy to repair a torn lateral meniscus, subsequently sidelining him for the rest of the season. On December 18, 2014, he was waived by the Celtics following the Rajon Rondo trade; he did not make an appearance for the Celtics in 2014–15.

Maccabi Tel Aviv
On July 10, 2015, Faverani signed with the Israeli club Maccabi Tel Aviv. On November 2, he was waived by Maccabi after appearing in only two official games.

Return to Spain
On December 30, 2015, Faverani returned to UCAM Murcia. On January 15, 2017, FC Barcelona Lassa bought him out, for €250,000, from UCAM Murcia and he signed a two-year deal with Barcelona. On May 18, 2017, Faverani and Barcelona mutually parted ways.

On July 26, 2017, Faverani returned to UCAM Murcia for the 2017–18 season. On August 26, 2018, Faverani signed a one-year deal with Delteco GBC of the Liga ACB.

Flamengo
In June 2021, Faverani returned to playing basketball after a three-year absence, when he signed a one-year contract in Brazil with Flamengo. He had been using the training facilities of team since January. It marked the first time Faverani played professionally in his native country.

NBA career statistics

Regular season

|-
| style="text-align:left;"| 
| style="text-align:left;"| Boston
| 37 || 8 || 13.2 || .435 || .300 || .649 || 3.5 || .4 || .4 || .7 || 4.4
|-
| style="text-align:center;" colspan=2 | Career
| 37 || 8 || 13.2 || .435 || .300 || .649 || 3.5 || .4 || .4 || .7 || 4.4

Career statistics

Domestic leagues

References

External links
ACB.com Profile
Eurobasket.com Profile
Euroleague.net Profile

1988 births
Living people
Baloncesto Málaga players
Basket Zaragoza players
Boston Celtics players
Brazilian expatriate basketball people in Spain
Brazilian expatriate basketball people in the United States
Brazilian men's basketball players
CB Axarquía players
Flamengo basketball players
CB Murcia players
FC Barcelona Bàsquet players
Gipuzkoa Basket players
Liga ACB players
Maccabi Tel Aviv B.C. players
Maine Red Claws players
National Basketball Association players from Brazil
Power forwards (basketball)
Sportspeople from Porto Alegre
Undrafted National Basketball Association players
Valencia Basket players